The Maritime Heritage Trail – Battle of Saipan is located within the protected waters of Saipan lagoon in the Northern Marianas archipelago. The majority of the dive sites including two Japanese shipwrecks, two Japanese aircraft, two US aircraft, a US landing vehicle and two Japanese landing craft can be found in the clear waters between Garapan, Tanapag Harbor, and Mañagaha Island while further south in Chalan Kanoa Lagoon there are three US tanks.

Maritime Heritage Trail 

Each of the dive sites along the trail are associated with the Battle of Saipan and include wrecked or discarded vehicles which were in use during World War II, representing one of the most pivotal battles fought in the Pacific Theatre.  Each of the stops along the trail are unique because they showcase a number of different underwater sites including airplanes, landing craft, tanks, and ships. These sites are significant to both the Japanese and US nations but also to Korean, Chamorro, Carolinian and Filipino peoples who were involved in the conflict. These underwater sites represent wartime activities that added to Saipan's rich maritime cultural heritage.

Tanapag Lagoon 

Tanapag Lagoon (Puetton Tanapag in Chamorro) has been Saipan's primary harbor from prehistoric times through to the present day. Due to its deep waters and natural barriers against the forces of the ocean, the lagoon has been an important maritime resource since prehistoric times. Mañagaha and the surrounding barrier reef form a natural breakwater making these waters an ideal haven for watercraft of all shapes and sizes. It was significant to the invasion of World War II. The Japanese Imperial Navy had a base here and launched decisive attacks against the Allied forces from this strategic position.  After seizing the island, the United States Navy took possession of the lagoon and expanded its harbor facilities substantially. Today it is home to 9 of the 12 sites that were chosen to be part of the maritime heritage trail.

Chalan Kanoa Lagoon

The Sites 

The dive sites on the trail give the events surrounding the Battle of Saipan a new life and can be seen as an extension to the various World War II sites on land. They allow visitors to see the battle from a different perspective.

Aircraft 

The airplane is an invention from recent history. Born during the industrial age they have been heavily mass-produced. During World War II naval aircraft were mass-produced in the thousands by both the US and the Japanese forces. The archaeological significance of surviving underwater military aircraft is growing fast. The aircraft of World War II are popular attractions on land and underwater and unfortunately are often the subject of collectors looking for a souvenir.

The WWII Maritime Heritage Trail includes four submerged aircraft. Providing examples of various war planes, they include a Japanese Kawanishi H8K (Allied named "Emily"), a Japanese Aichi E13A (Allied named "Jake"), a US Martin PBM Mariner, and a US TBM Avenger.

Auxiliary Vessels 

A large number of ships designed for commercial use were commissioned by the Imperial Japanese Navy for military service as auxiliary forces. These ships played a large role in the battles of the Pacific.  At least two dozen merchant vessels are known to have sunk in the waters surrounding Saipan during the war, several of which can be found in the lagoon.

The sites included in the heritage trail are a Japanese Merchant Vessel (presumably Shoan Maru), and a possible Japanese Auxiliary Submarine Chaser.

Landing Vehicles 

Amphibious vehicles including US LVTs (Landing Vehicle, Tracked) and Japanese Daihatsu Landing Craft played pivotal roles in the Battle of Saipan. LVTs were used in the initial invasion forces by the US. They were also known to have provided artillery support during the taking of Garapan, before the U.S. forces moved on to Tanapag.

There are three Landing Vehicles on the World War II heritage trail and they include two Japanese Daihatsu Landing craft and a US LVT(A)-4 (known as the "Marianas Model").

Sherman Tanks 

Three US Sherman Tanks, located within swimming distance of Oleai and Susupe beaches, played a significant role in the initial invasion by US forces.  The three tanks are semi-submerged and are a prime attraction for both locals and tourists due to their striking nature with turrets above the water. The area in which the tanks are located has been designated a National Historic Landmark associated with the action that took place on these beaches.

World War II 

 “The Marianas Campaign, from an amphibious view point had nearly everything; great strategic importance, major tactical moves including successive troop landings on three
 enemy islands; tough enemy resistance of all kinds, including major Fleet battle; coordination of every known type of combat technique of the land, sea, and air; difficult
 logistic problems; and the buildup of a great military base area concurrently with the fighting.” - 

War in the Pacific

Operation Forager

Battle of Saipan

Marine Protected Areas 

Saipan is roughly 10 miles long by 5 miles wide and the waters immediately surrounding this small island include eight marine protected areas. The Mañagaha Marine Conservation Area includes several of the heritage trail dive sites.

References

External links 
 Sunken Military Craft Act (10 USC 113)
 American Battlefield Protection Program ABPP
 WWII Maritime Heritage Trail ABPP, Flinders University
 TAKI's Imperial Japanese Army Page
 War in the Pacific: Online Forum
 Press and Announcements – Flinders University
 Full Text Online - "SAIPAN: The Ethnology of a War-Devastated Island"
  Operation Saipan 2010: Sites and Fieldwork

History of the Northern Mariana Islands
Saipan
Wreck diving sites
Conflicts in 1944
United States Marine Corps in World War II
Battles and operations of World War II involving Japan
Pacific theatre of World War II
Pacific Ocean theatre of World War II
World War II auxiliary ships
Historic districts in the Northern Mariana Islands
Heritage trails